Oberea sansibarica is a species of beetle in the family Cerambycidae. It was described by Harold in 1880.

References

Beetles described in 1880
sansibarica